Li Shixing; ca. (1282–1328) was a Chinese landscape painter during the Yuan Dynasty (1271–1368).

Li was born in Beijing. He specialized in landscapes and ink bamboo paintings.

References

1282 births
1328 deaths
Yuan dynasty landscape painters
Painters from Beijing